The name Moira, sometimes spelled Moyra, is an Anglicisation of the Irish name Máire, the Irish equivalent of Mary.
Transliterated with Greek letters Μοίρα is the Greek word for Destiny, i.e. the three Fates.

People

Television and film 
 Moira Brooker, English actress
 Moira Buffini, English dramatist, director and actor associated with the In-yer-face theatre style
 Moira Chen, a pseudonym for actress Laura Gemser
 Moyra Fraser, Australian-born English actress
 Moira Harris, American actress
 Moira Kelly, American actress
 Moira Lister, South African actress
 Moira McLean, Australian morning television presenter
 Moira Quirk, English actress
 Moira Redmond, English actress
 Moira Shearer, Scottish ballerina and actress
 Moira Stuart, the first Black woman newsreader on British television
 Moira Dela Torre, Filipina singer-songwriter

Other fields 
 Moira Anderson, Scottish singer
 Moira Brinnand, Argentine field hockey player 
 Moira Brown, Canadian-born North Atlantic right whale researcher
 Moira Cameron, British soldier, first woman Yeoman Warder of the Tower of London
 Moira Crone, American fiction author
 Moira Leiper Ducharme, first female mayor of Halifax, Nova Scotia
 Moira Gatens, Australian academic
 Moira Gunn, American radio host
 Moira MacLeod, British field hockey player 
 Moira O'Neill, Irish-Canadian poet
Moira Rayner (born 1948), New Zealand-born, Australian-based barrister and human rights advocate
 Moira Senior (born 1976), field hockey player from New Zealand

Fictional characters 
 Moira MacTaggert, a recurring character in X-Men comic books
 Moira/Max Sweeney, on the Showtime television network series The L Word
 Moira O'Hara, a character in the TV series American Horror Story
 Moira Queen, Oliver Queen's mother in the Green Arrow comic books
 Moira Queen, Oliver Queen's mother in the TV series Arrow
 Moira O’Deorain, a character in the video game Overwatch
 Wendy Moira Angela Darling, a character in Peter and Wendy by J. M. Barrie
 Moira Banning, wife of Peter Banning/Peter Pan in the movie Hook
 Moira Thaurissan, Queen Regent of the Dark Iron Clan, a minor character in the popular MMORPG World of Warcraft
 Moira, a character in Margaret Atwood's The Handmaid's Tale
 Moira Theirin, mother of Maric Theirin in BioWare's Dragon Age franchise
 Moira Brown, a character in Bethesda Game Studios' Fallout 3
 Moira Burton, a character in Capcom's Game Resident Evil: Revelations 2
 Moira Barton, recurring character in soap opera, Emmerdale
 Moira Vahlen, Chief Scientist in the video game, XCOM: Enemy Unknown
 Moira Queen of Remba in Roger Zelazny's Chronicles of Amber
 Moira Rose, a character in the Canadian television series Schitt's Creek
 Moira Davidson, a character in the novel and 1959 film On The Beach
 Moira, a minor character in the first episode of Pokémon: Black & White: Adventures in Unova
 Moira Crewe, a character in Seveneves by Neal Stephenson
 Moira Linton, a character in the Malory Towers novel series, by Enid Blyton

References

Irish feminine given names
English feminine given names

de:Moira
ja:モイラ